Kanjvaran-e Olya (also Romanized as Kanjvarān-e ‘Olyā; also known as Ganjvarān-e ‘Olyā, Gheyb Qoli, Gheyb Qoli Bala, and Gheyb Qolī-ye Bālā) is a village in Miyan Rud Rural District, Qolqol Rud District, Tuyserkan County, Hamadan Province, Iran. At the 2006 census, its population was 195, in 46 families.

References 

Populated places in Tuyserkan County